Kamila Mulačová (born 5 February 1987 as Kamila Mošová) is a Czech curler.

Teams

Women's

Mixed

Personal life
In 2014, she married fellow curler Martin Mulač and changed her surname to Mulačová. They played together at the 2015 World Mixed Curling Championship.

References

External links

  (web archive)
Mulačová (Mošová) Kamila - Player statistics (all games with his/her participation) - Czech Curling Association

Living people
1987 births
Czech female curlers
Competitors at the 2009 Winter Universiade
Competitors at the 2011 Winter Universiade